Chihuahua Engine is a  Engine factory in Chihuahua City, Mexico owned by Ford Motor Company. The plant opened in 1983, encompasses 247 acres, and as of 2010 employs 1,264 workers. In the past it has built Ford Penta and Zetec engines but currently builds 2.0 L, 2.0 L HEV, 2.5 L and 2.5 L HEV versions of the Duratec I4.  In 2010 the factory added capacity and began building the 6.7 L Power Stroke Diesel used in Ford Super Duty trucks and the 4.4 L diesel V8 for Land Rover.

Current Products
Ford Duratec engine 
 2.0 L
 2.0 L HEV
 2.5 L
 2.5 L HEV
Ford Power Stroke engine
 6.7 L
Ford 4.4 Turbo Diesel
 4.4 L

References
Ford Motor Company Facilities Details https://web.archive.org/web/20111212082051/http://media.ford.com/plant_display.cfm?plant_id=15

See also
 List of Ford factories

External links

Ford factories